Seth Cropsey is an American neoconservative political figure and lobbyist.

Biography
He is the son of Joseph Cropsey and father of Gabriel, noted Straussian political philosopher and professor at the University of Chicago. Graduated from Harvard-St. George School, Chicago, IL and St. John's College and received his M.A. from Boston College.
From 1977 to 1980, he was a reporter for Fortune magazine. In 1981, Cropsey was speechwriter and assistant to Secretary of Defense Caspar Weinberger. Between 1982 and 1984, Cropsey was Director of Policy at the Voice of America. He was Deputy Undersecretary of the Navy during both the Ronald Reagan and George H. W. Bush Presidential administrations, and in 1991, was the principal Assistant Secretary of Defense for Special Operations/Low Intensity Conflict & Interdependent Capabilities.

Between 1994 and 1998, Cropsey was Director of the Heritage Foundation's Asia Studies Center and Professor of the George C. Marshall European Center for Security Studies in Garmisch-Partenkirchen, Germany. From 1999 to 2001 he was a visiting fellow at the American Enterprise Institute.

He worked as a Director of Governmental Affairs at the lobbying law firm of Greenberg Traurig in 2002, and was a registered lobbyist with that firm.

Crospey was a signatory of the Letter to President Bush on the War on Terrorism. On December 9, 2002, Cropsey joined the George W. Bush Administration as the director of the International Broadcasting Bureau. His works have been published in Commentary, Foreign Affairs, Policy Review, The National Interest, National Review, and The Wall Street Journal and the inaugural Joint Force Quarterly. He is the author of Mayday: The Decline of American Naval Supremacy.

Affiliations
 American Enterprise Institute, visiting fellow, 1998–2001
 Heritage Foundation
 Hudson Institute

Bibliography

Books

Critical studies and reviews of Cropsey's work
Seablindness

References

External links

 Hudson Institute biography
 

The Heritage Foundation
St. John's College (Annapolis/Santa Fe) alumni
George W. Bush administration personnel
Boston College alumni
Living people
1948 births
Hudson Institute
Naval War College Review people